This page documents all the tornadoes that touched down in the United States in October to December 2007. Tornadoes in the month of January are given with their Fujita Scale intensity while all tornadoes from February and on are given with their Enhanced Fujita Scale intensity. This is because the scale was changed on February 1 due to the National Weather Service implementing a more accurate way to classify tornadoes.

United States Yearly Total

Note: January tornadoes were rated using the old Fujita scale, but are included in the chart above by matching the F rating to the related EF scale rating.

October

There were 115 tornadoes were reported in the US in October, of which 87 were confirmed.

October 17 event

October 18 event

November

November 5 event

November 14 event

November 19 event

December

There were 22 tornadoes were reported in the US in December, of which 19 were confirmed.

December 2

December 15

December 16

See also
 Tornadoes of 2007
 List of United States tornadoes from August to September 2007
 List of United States tornadoes from January to February 2008

Notes

References

F4 tornadoes
Tornadoes of 2007
2007 natural disasters in the United States
2007